SS Glentworth was a shelter deck cargo steamship built in 1920 by Hawthorn Leslie & Co. in Newcastle-upon-Tyne, England for R.S. Dalgliesh and Dalgliesh Steam Shipping Co. Ltd., also of Newcastle-upon-Tyne. After the Great Depression affected UK merchant shipping in the first years of the 1930s, Dalgliesh sold Glentworth to a company controlled by Counties Ship Management (an offshoot of the Rethymnis & Kulukundis shipbroking company of London) who renamed her SS Box Hill.

Details
She was built as a turbine steamer: two steam turbines with a combined power output of 620 NHP drove the shaft to the single propeller by reduction gearing. However, when she changed hands in 1934 she was re-engined with a Hawthorn Leslie 586 NHP three-cylinder triple expansion steam engine. The conversion retained her original boilers, but her furnaces were converted to oil burning.

The ship was equipped with direction finding equipment and radio.

Loss
Late in 1939 Box Hill sailed from Saint John, New Brunswick bound for Hull with a cargo of 8,452 tons wheat. The explosion broke her back and she sank almost immediately with the loss of all hands.

Box Hill was Counties Ship Management's first loss of the Second World War. CSM's losses continued until just a week before the surrender of Japan in August 1945, by which time the company had lost a total of 13 ships.

Both sections of Box Hills wreck were a hazard to shipping and showed above the water. In 1952 the Royal Navy dispersed her remains with high explosive and Admiralty charts now mark her position as a "foul" ground.

References

Sources & further reading

1920 ships
Maritime incidents in December 1939
Ships of Counties Ship Management
Ships sunk by mines
Ships built on the River Wear
World War II shipwrecks in the North Sea
World War II merchant ships of the United Kingdom